Peter Fong (born 1941) is a former Fijian international lawn bowler.

Bowls career
Fong has represented Fiji at four Commonwealth Games. He competed in the fours event at the 1974 British Commonwealth Games, the fours event at the 1978 Commonwealth Games, the pairs event at the 1982 Commonwealth Games and the singles event at the 1986 Commonwealth Games.

He won the singles gold medal and the pairs bronze medal at the inaugural 1985 Asia Pacific Bowls Championships, at Tweed Heads, New South Wales and the 1991 triples at Kowloon.

Personal life
he was a marketing manager by trade and now bowls in Australia for the Merrylands Bowling Club and is the husband of female bowls international Willow Fong.

References

Fijian male bowls players
1941 births
Living people
Bowls players at the 1974 British Commonwealth Games
Bowls players at the 1978 Commonwealth Games
Bowls players at the 1982 Commonwealth Games
Bowls players at the 1986 Commonwealth Games
Fellows of the American Physical Society